Gretsch is a surname. Notable people with the surname include: 

Émile Gretsch (1908–2004), Luxembourgian fencer
Joel Gretsch (born 1963), American actor
Kendall Gretsch (born 1992), American triathlete, biathlete and cross-country skier
Nikolay Gretsch (1787–1867), Russian grammarian
Patrick Gretsch (born 1987), German cyclist